Albert Edward "Butch" Prior (15 January 1921 – 21 January 1971) was an Australian rules footballer who played with Hawthorn in the VFL during the 1940s.

Family
The son of Thomas Edward Prior (1882–1968), and Charlotte Nicholls Prior (1884–1956), née Jensen, Albert Edward Prior was born at Melbourne, Victoria on 15 January 1921.

He married June Ivy Rose Braden (1924–2003) in 1945.

Football
A full-forward, he topped Hawthorn's goalkicking in every season from 1946 to 1949 with a best of 67 goals in 1947. He kicked 8 goals in a match three times: against Footscray on 3 May 1947, against Richmond on 17 May 1947 and, in his last match for Hawthorn, in a season where Hawthorn lost all 18 of its home-and-away games, against South Melbourne on 19 August 1950.

In 1951 Prior was cleared from Hawthorn and was appointed coach of the East Hawthorn team in the Eastern Suburban League.

Military service
Prior also served in the Australian Army during World War II.

Honours and achievements
Individual
 Hawthorn leading goalkicker: 1946, 1947, 1948, 1949
 Hawthorn life member

Notes

References
 World War Two Nominal Roll: Signalman Albert Edward Prior (VX131343), Department of Veterans' Affairs.
 B883, VX131343: World War Two Service Record: Signalman Albert Edward Prior (VX131343), National Archives of Australia.

External links
 
 
 Albert Prior at Boyles Football Photos.

1921 births
Australian rules footballers from Melbourne
Hawthorn Football Club players
Camberwell Football Club players
1971 deaths
Australian Army personnel of World War II
Australian Army soldiers
Military personnel from Melbourne